Jordan Abel is a Nisga'a poet who lives and works in Edmonton, Alberta, Canada.

Life and work
Abel, a Nisga'a poet, was born in British Columbia. Formerly a doctoral student at Simon Fraser University in the Department of English, he is currently a professor at the University of Alberta. Abel's work addresses settler-colonialism directly, often through conceptual poetic approaches to overtly colonial texts (for example, Abel's books cut up, sample, and interrupt the Project Gutenberg archive of Western novels and Marius Barbeau's Totem Poles).

His first book of poetry, The Place of Scraps (Talonbooks), used as source text the work of 20th century ethnographer Marius Barbeau. It won the Dorothy Livesay Poetry Prize and was a finalist for the Gerald Lampert Award in 2014. His second book, Un/inhabited, was named one of the best 75 books of 2015 by the CBC.

Abel's third and most recent book of poetry, Injun, won the Griffin Poetry Prize in 2017. The poems were based on 91 Western novels written during the past three centuries.

Abel's memoir NISHGA was published in 2020, and was shortlisted for the 2021 Hilary Weston Writers' Trust Prize for Nonfiction.

Poetry
 The Place Of Scraps (Talonbooks, 2013)
 Un/inhabited (Talonbooks, 2015)
 Injun (Talonbooks, 2016)
 NISHGA (Penguin Random House, 2020)

References

External links

Living people
Canadian male poets
First Nations poets
Nisga'a people
Writers from British Columbia
Simon Fraser University alumni
Canadian male non-fiction writers
Canadian memoirists
21st-century Canadian male writers
21st-century Canadian poets
21st-century First Nations writers
21st-century Canadian non-fiction writers
Year of birth missing (living people)